Velká Lhota is a municipality and village in Vsetín District in the Zlín Region of the Czech Republic. It has about 500 inhabitants.

Administrative parts
The village of Malá Lhota is an administrative part of Velká Lhota.

Notable people
Jan Karafiát (1846–1929), children's book writer; lived and worked here in 1875–1895

References

Villages in Vsetín District
Moravian Wallachia